Woman Talk is a live album by jazz vocalist Carmen McRae featuring tracks recorded at the Village Gate in New York in November 1965 and originally released on the Mainstream label the following year. The second half of the concert came out in 1968 as "Live" & Wailing. The whole recording was compiled on a double LP in 1973 under the title Alive!.

Reception

Allmusic awarded the album 3 stars and states "All in all, a very satisfying set from a singer who may not be quite up to the level of Billie Holiday, Ella Fitzgerald, and Sarah Vaughan, but who is certainly close enough to be numbered among the vocal jazz elite".

Track listing
 "Sometimes I'm Happy" (Vincent Youmans, Irving Caesar, Clifford Grey) - 3:27
 "Don't Explain" (Arthur Herzog, Jr., Billie Holiday) - 4:15
 "Woman Talk" (John Scott, Caryl Brahms) - 4:51
 "Kick Off Your Shoes" (Cy Coleman, Murray Grand) - 2:16
 "The Shadow of Your Smile" (Johnny Mandel, Paul Francis Webster) - 3:53
 "The Sweetest Sounds" (Richard Rodgers) - 2:03
 "Where Would You Be Without Me?" (Anthony Newley, Leslie Bricusse) - 2:34
 "Feeling Good" (Newley, Bricusse) - 4:33
 "Run, Run, Run" (Russ Freeman, J. Reisner) - 2:30
 "No More" (Tutti Camarata, Bob Russell) - 3:19
 "Look at That Face" (Bricusse, Newley) - 5:02
 "I Wish I Were in Love Again" (Rodgers, Lorenz Hart) - 1:33

Personnel 
 Carmen McRae - vocal
 Ray Beckenstein - flute
 Norman Simmons - piano
 Jo Puma - guitar
 Paul Breslin - double bass
 Frank Severino - drums
 Jose Mangual - bongos

References 

1966 live albums
Carmen McRae live albums
Mainstream Records live albums
Albums recorded at the Village Gate